Culama dasythrix is a moth in the family Cossidae. It was described by Alfred Jefferis Turner in 1945. It is found in Australia, where it has been recorded in southern Western Australia.

The wingspan is 37–39 mm. The forewings are light grey with a pattern of subbasal and medial brown patches with white borders. Adults have been recorded on wing in April and September.

References

Natural History Museum Lepidoptera generic names catalog

Cossinae
Moths described in 1945
Moths of Australia